Maria Helena Diniz (born 1956, São Paulo) is a Brazilian jurist and professor. She currently holds the chair of full professor of Civil Law at the Pontifical Catholic University of São Paulo, where she obtained her master's (1974) and doctorate (1976) degrees. She is the author of more than forty books and articles in the field of law, mainly in the civil area.

In constitutional law, Maria Helena Diniz proposes a new classification, based on intangibility and the production of concrete effects. Thus, it divides them into constitutional norms of absolute, full, restrictable relative  and  complementable relative (or complementation-dependent) effectiveness.

Published books and works 
Main published works
Brazilian Civil Law Course - General Theory of Civil Law
Brazilian Civil Law Course - General Theory of Obligations
The Gaps in Law
Compendium of introduction to the science of law
Concept of Legal Norm as an Essential Problem
1988 Constitution: Legitimacy, Effectiveness, Effectiveness and Supremacy

Known for her rigid work in describing her works, the best known being the Civil Law Course, she is always recommended for the best interpretation of the Course, her important work "Dicionario Juridico Universitário". Both works are issued by Saraiva publishing house.

See also 
 Philosophy of law

References

Brazilian philosophers
20th-century Brazilian lawyers
Academic staff of the Pontifical Catholic University of São Paulo
Brazilian people of Portuguese descent
People associated with the University of São Paulo
21st-century Brazilian lawyers
1956 births
Living people
Brazilian women lawyers